The 1985 Idaho Vandals football team represented the University of Idaho in the 1985 NCAA Division I-AA football season. The Vandals, led by fourth-year head coach Dennis Erickson, were members of the Big Sky Conference and played their home games at the Kibbie Dome, an indoor facility on campus in Moscow, Idaho.

The 1985 season marked the first time that the Vandal football program had four consecutive winning seasons; this streak extended to fifteen in 1996.

Notable games
The Vandals opened the season with a fifteen-point loss at Oregon State in Corvallis, whom they had defeated the year before in Moscow. After six straight losses to Nevada, Idaho recorded its first conference victory over the Wolf Pack, who joined the Big Sky in 1979. The Vandals defeated rival Boise State for the fourth consecutive year, the fourth of twelve straight over the Broncos, and were ranked fifth in the final I-AA poll, released prior to the postseason. A key one-point road loss at Idaho State in late October prevented the Vandals from attaining an important first round bye in the I-AA playoffs.

Division I-AA playoffs
After a two-season absence, Idaho returned to the twelve-team I-AA playoffs, hosting independent Eastern Washington, whom they had defeated four weeks earlier by three touchdowns. The eleventh-ranked Eagles won the rematch, a back-and-forth contest before a sparse crowd at the Kibbie Dome, two days after Thanksgiving. (EWU joined the Big Sky in 1987, raising league membership to nine.)

For the following season in 1986, the I-AA playoffs expanded from 12 to 16 teams, which eliminated the bye week for the top four seeds.

Notable players
The 1985 team included two future NFL head coaches: quarterback Scott Linehan and offensive lineman Tom Cable. Future NFL players with lengthy pro careers included guard Mark Schlereth (redshirt freshman starting on defense this season) and true freshman John Friesz, a future collegiate hall of fame quarterback as a three-year starter (1987–89), but inactive in 1985 as a redshirt.

Coaches
This was the fourth and final season at Idaho for head coach Dennis Erickson and defensive coordinator John L. Smith. Offensive coordinator Keith Gilbertson returned to that position on a volunteer basis after three spring seasons in the USFL with the L.A. Express. Days after Erickson's early December departure for Wyoming, Gilbertson was promoted to head coach for 1986. Smith followed Erickson to Laramie and back to the Palouse at Washington State in 1987, then returned to the Vandals in January 1989. He succeeded Gilbertson, who left after three seasons for an assistant's position in Seattle, as offensive line coach under head coach Don James at Washington.

Schedule

Roster

All-conference
Wide receiver Eric Yarber and junior linebacker Tom Hennessey were the offensive and defensive players of the year in the Big Sky, respectively, and were joined on the all-conference team by junior safety Mark Tidd (unanimous), senior tackle Mark Caldwell, and senior defensive tackle John Andrews.

Six Vandals, all on offense, were on the second team: quarterback Rick Sloan, tight end Scott Auker, wide receiver Brant Bengen, center Matt Watson, and guards Tom Cable and Joe Smiley. Honorable mention went to tackle Dave Thorsen and running back Todd Hoiness.

Yarber was named to the Kodak All-American team for Division I-AA.

References

External links
Gem of the Mountains: 1986 University of Idaho yearbook – 1985 football season
Idaho Argonaut – student newspaper – 1985  editions

Idaho
Idaho Vandals football seasons
Big Sky Conference football champion seasons
Idaho Vandals football